Kabonero is a surname. Notable people with the surname include:

Bob Kabonero (born 1965), Ugandan businessman and entrepreneur
Richard Kabonero (born 1963), Ugandan civil servant and diplomat, brother of Bob